Tohi may refer to the following people:
Aisea Tohi (born 1987), Tongan sprint runner
Sopolemalama Filipe Tohi (born 1959), Tongan artist
Tohi Te Ururangi (died 1864), New Zealand tribal leader and assessor
Tohi (singer) (born 1988), Iranian Singer

See also
Tohi Tala Niue, a defunct Niuean daily newspaper